The second USS Bonita (SP-540) was a United States Navy patrol vessel commissioned in 1917 and sunk in 1918.

Bonita was built as a private pleasure craft by the Holmes Motor Company at Mystic, Connecticut. On 17 May 1917, the U.S. Navy acquired her from her owner, Mr. Robert Windsor of Boston, Massachusetts, for use as a section patrol vessel during World War I. She was commissioned as USS Bonita (SP-540) soon thereafter.

Assigned to the 1st Naval District, Bonita operated on patrol duties in Boston Harbor for the rest of World War I.

Before dawn on 26 November 1918, Bonita collided with the fishing schooner Russell and sank. Repeated efforts to locate Bonitas wreck proved unsuccessful, and she was stricken from the Navy List on 18 December 1918.

Notes

References

Department of the Navy Naval History and Heritage Command Online Library of Selected Images: U.S. Navy Ships: USS Bonita (SP-540), 1917-1918
NavSource Online: Section Patrol Craft Photo Archive: Bonita (SP 540)

Patrol vessels of the United States Navy
World War I patrol vessels of the United States
Ships built in Mystic, Connecticut
Ships sunk in collisions
Maritime incidents in 1918
Shipwrecks of the Massachusetts coast